Brenko Lee (born 10 October 1995) is a Tonga international rugby league footballer who plays as a  and er for the Dolphins in the NRL. 

Lee previously played for the Brisbane Broncos, Canberra Raiders, Canterbury-Bankstown Bulldogs, Melbourne Storm and the Gold Coast Titans in the National Rugby League. He has played for Queensland in the State of Origin series, and is notable for being undefeated in the series. He is a NRL premiership winning player of 2020.

Early life
Lee was born in Brisbane, Queensland, Australia. He is of Tongan, Nauruan and Indigenous descent. Lee is the cousin of Redcliffe Dolphins   rugby league player Edrick Lee, NBA basketball player Patty Mills and NBL basketball player Nathan Jawai. Edrick's uncle is former Olympian basketballer Danny Morseu, the second Indigenous Australian to represent Australia at the Olympics in basketball.  Edrick's great uncle is Indigenous land rights activist Eddie Mabo. 

Lee attended school at Marsden State High School, Logan City and played his junior rugby league for the Logan Brothers, before being signed by the Canberra Raiders.

Playing career

Early career
From 2013 to 2015, Lee played for the Canberra Raiders' NYC team. On 20 April 2013, he played for the Queensland under-20s team against the New South Wales under-20s team. On 5 December 2013, he re-signed with the Canberra Raiders on a three-year contract.

2014
On 3 May, Lee again played for the Queensland Under-20s team against the New South Wales under-20s team. In Round 15 of the 2014 NRL season, he made his NRL debut for the Raiders against the Canterbury-Bankstown Bulldogs on the wing in the Raiders' 22–14 loss at Canberra Stadium. In the next round, against the Wests Tigers, he scored his first and second tries in the NRL, in Canberra's 19–18 loss at Leichhardt Oval. After Round 21, after the Raiders' 54–18 loss to New Zealand Warriors at Canberra Stadium, his year was over as he struggled with a hamstring injury. He finished his debut year in the NRL having played in 4 matches and scoring 3 tries.

2015
On 2 May, Lee played for the Junior Kangaroos against Junior Kiwis. On 11 September, he was named in the 58-man Tonga squad to play the Cook Islands on 17 October.

2017
In October 2016, Lee signed a two-year contract with the Canterbury-Bankstown Bulldogs starting in 2017.

On 3 March 2017, Lee made his debut for the Canterbury-Bankstown Bulldogs against the Melbourne Storm at Belmore Sports Ground.

Lee made his international debut for Mate Ma'a Tonga in the 2017 Pacific Rugby League Tests against Fiji Bati.

In December 2017, Lee signed a one-year contract with the Gold Coast for the 2018 NRL season.

2018
Lee made 14 appearances for the Gold Coast in 2018 and scored 3 tries as the club struggled on the field finishing 14th at the end of the season.

2019
Lee was limited to 6 appearances for the Gold Coast in the 2019 NRL season as the club endured a horror season winning 4 games all year and finished last on the table claiming the wooden spoon.

On 5 December 2019, after failing to be re-signed by the Gold Coast, it was revealed that Lee had signed on with Queensland Cup outfit, the Easts Tigers, for the 2020 season.

2020
Lee signed with the Melbourne Storm and he featured in the 2020 NRL Nines hosted at Perth, Australia.

In round 4 of the 2020 season, Lee made his Melbourne Storm debut against the Rabbitohs at AAMI Park. Lee played centre in the Storm's 2020 NRL Grand Final over the Penrith Panthers in a 26-20 win.

After a stellar season he was rewarded with selection in the Queensland Maroons squad for the 2020 State of Origin series.

2021
On 28 May 2021, Lee signed a two-year contract to join the Brisbane Broncos to start in 2022. Restricted by injuries, Lee only made four appearances for Brisbane Tigers in the 2021 Queensland Cup, not making it back to the Broncos squad.

2022
In June, Lee signed a two-year deal to join the newly admitted Dolphins (NRL) team ahead of the 2023 NRL season.

References

External links

Canterbury Bulldogs profile

1995 births
Living people
Australian rugby league players
Australian sportspeople of Tongan descent
Australian people of Nauruan descent
Canberra Raiders players
Canterbury-Bankstown Bulldogs players
Eastern Suburbs Tigers players
Indigenous Australian rugby league players
Junior Kangaroos players
Gold Coast Titans players
Melbourne Storm players
Brisbane Broncos players
Dolphins (NRL) players
Queensland Rugby League State of Origin players
Souths Logan Magpies players
Mount Pritchard Mounties players
Rugby league centres
Rugby league wingers
Rugby league players from Brisbane